The 1991 Munster Senior Hurling Championship Final was a hurling match played on 7 July 1991 at Páirc Uí Chaoimh, Cork. It was contested by Cork and Tipperary. The final finished in a draw with a scoreline of 4-10 to 2-16.
Tipperary captained by Declan Carr and managed by Bab's Keating won the replay by 4-19 to 4-15 on 21 July in Semple Stadium after coming back from nine points down, Cork had led by 3-13 to 1-10 with just a quarter of the game remaining. Aidan Ryan's late goal into the corner of the net sparked a pitch invasion from the Killinan End. Cork has a 2-8 to 1-7 lead at halftime in the replay.	
							
Highlights of both games were shown as part of The Sunday Game programme on RTÉ 2 on the Sunday night. The programmes were presented by Michael Lyster with commentary by Ger Canning. The replay was described by the Irish Independent in 2014 and 2015 as one of the best games of hurling ever to be played.

Match details

Replay

References

External links
Match Highights of drawn game
Match Highights of the replay
Match Programme of drawn game

Munster
Munster Senior Hurling Championship Finals
Cork county hurling team matches
Tipperary GAA matches